Simp is derogatory Internet slang for a man seen as displaying excessive sympathy or attention toward a woman online.

Simp or SIMP may also refer to:

 Solid Isotropic Material with Penalisation, a method of topology optimization
 Solitary Islands Marine Park, New South Wales 
 Sri Indera Mahkota Pahang, an honor given by the Sultan of Pahang, Malaysia
 Strongly interacting massive particle, a hypothetical elementary particle
 Sondage Infrarouge de Mouvement Propre, an infrared astronomical survey searching for Brown Dwarves with high proper motion
 Simp., a non-standard abbreviation for 'simplified', as in "Simplified Chinese"

See also 
 
 EconSimp, a fisheries management model
 SIMP J013656.5+093347, a brown dwarf
 Simpleton
 Simpson (disambiguation)